The Trust for the Americas is a non-profit 501(c)(3) affiliate of the Organization of American States that works to promote economic, social, and political development in Latin America and the Caribbean. Established in 1997, it works through public and private partnerships.

References

Organizations established in 1907
1907 establishments in the United States
501(c)(3) organizations